Oxydromus is a genus of annelids belonging to the family Hesionidae.

The genus has cosmopolitan distribution.

Species:

Oxydromus adorsosetosus 
Oxydromus adspersus 
Oxydromus agilis 
Oxydromus angolaensis 
Oxydromus angustifrons 
Oxydromus aucklandicus 
Oxydromus berrisfordi 
Oxydromus blacki 
Oxydromus brevipodius 
Oxydromus bunbuku 
Oxydromus constrictus 
Oxydromus didymocerus 
Oxydromus fauveli 
Oxydromus flexuosus 
Oxydromus furcatus 
Oxydromus guanicus 
Oxydromus humesi 
Oxydromus lanai 
Oxydromus latifrons 
Oxydromus limicolus 
Oxydromus longicirratus 
Oxydromus longifundus 
Oxydromus longisetis 
Oxydromus microantennatus 
Oxydromus minutus 
Oxydromus mutilatus 
Oxydromus notospinosus 
Oxydromus obscurus 
Oxydromus okudai 
Oxydromus okupa 
Oxydromus pallidus 
Oxydromus parapallidus 
Oxydromus pelagicus 
Oxydromus pugettensis 
Oxydromus spinapandens 
Oxydromus spinosus 
Oxydromus viridescens 
Oxydromus vittatus

References

Annelids